Dumara is a village in North Sulawesi (Sulawesi Utara) in Indonesia. It lies on the left bank of the Dumoga River.

Notes

Populated places in North Sulawesi